Hypnotized and Hysterical (Hairstylist Wanted) (original title: Filles perdues, cheveux gras English: Lost Girls, Greasy Hair) is a 2002 French musical comedy-drama film about the crossing paths of three lost young women. It was directed by Claude Duty.

The film premiered at the Cannes Film Festival on 17 May 2002.

Plot

Three lost women cross paths and help each other. Elodie (Olivia Bonamy) wants her daughter back, Natacha (Marina Foïs) wants her cat back, and Marianne (Amira Casar) wants her soul back.

Cast

 Amira Casar as Marianne
 Marina Foïs as Natacha
 Olivia Bonamy as Élodie
 Charles Berling as Arnaud
 Sergi López as Philippe
 Léa Drucker as Coraline
 Esse Lawson as Cindy
 Margot Abascal as Corine
 Evelyne Buyle as Madame Pélissier
 Judith El Zein as Marianne's Mother
 Béatrice Costantini as Natasha's boss
 Amadou Diallo as Kirikou
 Jean-François Gallotte as Jean-François
 Amelle Chahbi as Karine
 Lorella Cravotta as Chief Nurse
 Lise Lamétrie as Elodie's colleague

Accolades

References

External links
 
 

2002 films
2000s musical comedy-drama films
French musical comedy-drama films
2002 directorial debut films
2002 comedy films
2002 drama films
2000s French films